Rabbit alla Sanremese (or rabbit alla sanremasca, Cunìu a-a sanremasca in dialect) is a recipe based on rabbit, cooked and served with a sauce enriched with olives, walnuts and herbs.

Its a traditional dish of Ligurian cuisine.

The rabbit meat is "al salto" in a pan where onion, thyme, rosemary, a stalk of celery, a few walnuts, a glass of red wine and taggiasche olives are added. Separately, the liver and the head of the rabbit are cooked and pounded to extract the sauce.

The sauce can also be used to season pasta.

With some variations the recipe is spread all over Liguria and is called Coniglio alla ligure.

See also 
 Coniglio all'ischitana

Note 

Rabbit dishes
Sanremo
Cuisine of Liguria